Manikhedi is a village in the Bhopal district of Madhya Pradesh, India. It is located in the Berasia tehsil.

It is located on the road connecting Gunga and Dillod, near the Guna-Bhopal road.

Demographics 

According to the 2011 census of India, Manikhedi has 239 households. The effective literacy rate (i.e. the literacy rate of population excluding children aged 6 and below) is 74.79%.

References 

Villages in Berasia tehsil